František Kobzík (22 March 1914 – 7 May 1944) was a Czech rower. He competed in the men's eight event at the 1936 Summer Olympics.

On the onset of the German occupation of Czechoslovakia, Kobzík left the country. He joined the French Foreign Legion and was trained in Sidi Bel Abbès. After the defeat of France to Nazi Germany, he was evacuated to England, where he joined the Czechoslovak Army in exile. In Scotland, Kobzík underwent a parachutist training. On the night of 12-13 April 1944, he parachuted near Vacenovice in Moravian Slovakia. Together with his companion, Kobzík managed to move to the village of Rudice. On 7 May, a local person notified Protectorate authorities about their presence. Being surrounded by the police, Kobzík with his companion committed suicide.

References

External links
 

1914 births
1944 suicides
Czech male rowers
Olympic rowers of Czechoslovakia
Rowers at the 1936 Summer Olympics
People from Břeclav
Soldiers of the French Foreign Legion
Czechoslovak military personnel of World War II
Recipients of the Czechoslovak War Cross
Czechoslovak military personnel killed in World War II
Suicides in Czechoslovakia
Suicides in the Czech Republic
Joint suicides
1944 deaths
Sportspeople from the South Moravian Region